Weymouth and Portland was a local government district and borough in Dorset, England. It consisted of the resort of Weymouth and the Isle of Portland, and includes the areas of Wyke Regis, Preston, Melcombe Regis, Upwey, Broadwey, Southill, Nottington, Westham, Radipole, Chiswell, Castletown, Fortuneswell, Weston, Southwell and Easton; the latter six being on the Isle of Portland.

In Portland Harbour is the Weymouth and Portland National Sailing Academy, where the sailing events at the 2012 Olympics took place. The main reason that the resort was chosen to be an Olympic venue was that the Sailing Academy had only recently been built, so no new venue would need to be provided. Weymouth and Portland's waters have also been credited by the Royal Yachting Association as the best in Northern Europe.

Weymouth and Portland have been twinned with the town of Holzwickede in North Rhine-Westphalia, Germany, since 1986, and the French town of Louviers, in the department of Eure in Normandy, since 1959.

Politics 
The district of Weymouth and Portland was formed on 1 April 1974 under the Local Government Act 1972, which merged the borough of Weymouth and Melcombe Regis and the nearby Portland urban district. The district was divided into 15 wards for elections—12 of those in Weymouth, and three in Portland. Elections took place in a four-year cycle; one third of the councillors in all but three wards retire or seek re-election in years one, two and three, and county council elections were held in year four. In its final term the District Council was a multi-party administration under the leadership of the Conservatives.

Weymouth and Portland and Purbeck districts were in the South Dorset parliamentary constituency, created in 1885. The constituency elects one Member of Parliament. The current MP for South Dorset is Richard Drax, a member of the Conservative Party, who was voted in during the 2010 General Election, beating the incumbent Labour MP Jim Knight. Weymouth and Portland, the rest of the south west, and Gibraltar were in the South West England constituency of the European Parliament.

The borough and its council was abolished on 1 April 2019 and, together with the other 4 districts outside the greater Bournemouth area, formed a new Dorset unitary authority. At the same time, a town council serving only Weymouth and its suburbs was formed, called Weymouth Town Council.

See also

 Weymouth and Portland Borough Council elections
 List of churches in Weymouth and Portland

References

 
Non-metropolitan districts of Dorset
Former non-metropolitan districts
Former boroughs in England
2019 disestablishments in England